Kip Peak is a summit rising to over , located  northeast of Tempest Peak on a northeast trending ridge, in the Queen Alexandra Range of Antarctica. It was named by the Advisory Committee on Antarctic Names in 1995 after geologist Christopher A. Miller (known as "Kip") of the Ohio State University, who conducted field research in this area, 1990–91.

References

External links

Mountains of the Ross Dependency
Shackleton Coast